Jegliniec  is a village in the administrative district of Gmina Szypliszki, within Suwałki County, Podlaskie Voivodeship, in north-eastern Poland, close to the border with Lithuania.

Remnants of a Yotvingian fortified settlement are located in this village. The town was founded near the end of the 18th century in Grodno County, Trakai Voivodeship. From 1975 to 1998, it was in Suwałki Voivodeship.

References

Villages in Suwałki County